The  is the presiding officer of the House of Representatives of Japan, and together with the President of the House of Councillors, the Speaker is also the head of the legislative branch of Japan. The Speaker is elected by members of the House at the start of each session, and can serve for a maximum of four years.

The current Speaker of the House of Representatives is Hiroyuki Hosoda, who took office on 10 November 2021.

Selection

The election of the Speaker takes place on the day of the new session, under the moderation of the Secretary-General of the House. The Speaker is elected by an anonymous vote, and must have at least half of the votes in order to take office. If no one gets over half of the votes, the top two candidates will be voted again, and if they get the same number of votes, the Speaker is elected by a lottery. The Vice Speaker is elected separately, in the same way.

Usually, the Speaker is a senior member of the ruling party, and the Vice Speaker is a senior member of the opposition party. The current Speaker, Hiroyuki Hosoda, is a member of the ruling Liberal Democratic Party, while the Vice Speaker, Banri Kaieda, is a member of the Constitutional Democratic Party of Japan.

Powers and Duties

According to Chapter III Article 19 of the Diet Law, the Speaker "shall maintain order in the House, arrange its business, supervise its administration, and represent the House".

The Speaker is also authorized to maintain order in the House chambers by exercising police power. Upon the Speaker's request, police personnel are sent by the National Police Agency, and are placed under the Speaker's direction. The Speaker may then order arrest or removal of a member of the House or a visitor.

According to Chapter XIV Chapter 116 of the Diet law, when a member of the House of Representatives acts in a disorderly manner, the Speaker can warn them or make them withdraw their statements. If the member does not obey these orders, the Speaker can forbid the member to speak or make the member leave the chamber until the end of the proceedings. If the chamber goes out of control and becomes over chaotic, the Speaker may also temporarily suspend or adjourn the sitting for the day.

List of speakers

List of vice speakers

References

 
Politics of Japan
Lists of political office-holders in Japan
1885 establishments in Japan